The Volkswagen T-Roc is a subcompact crossover SUV (B-segment) manufactured by German automaker Volkswagen since 2017. It is based on the Volkswagen Group MQB A1 platform, and positioned between the Tiguan and the slightly smaller T-Cross.

Overview 
The T-Roc was previewed as a concept car with the same name at the 2014 Geneva Motor Show. It features an all-wheel drive drivetrain.

The production version of the T-Roc for the European market was launched in Italy on 23 August 2017 as Volkswagen's fourth SUV in the European market. It is the second Volkswagen SUV to sit in the compact crossover SUV class and also the first Volkswagen SUV to sit in the B-SUV segment. The T-Roc is based on the MQB A1 platform and is closely related with the Volkswagen Golf Mk7, SEAT León Mk3, Audi A3 Mk3, and the Škoda Octavia Mk3. It is equipped with a MacPherson strut front suspension and, depending on the engine and drive system, either a torsion beam or multi-link rear suspension in combination with optional adaptive dampers.

European market units are assembled at Volkswagen Autoeuropa plant in Palmela, Setúbal, Portugal. Chinese market cars are assembled by FAW-Volkswagen joint-venture plant in Foshan, Guangdong.

The T-Roc was showcased in India at the 2020 Auto Expo, and was launched in the country as an import in March 2020.

China 

Previewed earlier as the Volkswagen T-Rocstar concept, the T-Roc was unveiled to the Chinese market on 23 March 2018 and went on sale on 30 July 2018. The Chinese version of the T-Roc is larger than the European one, having the wheelbase longer by 90 mm, length by 84 mm, and its height taller by 9 mm. The powertrains are mated with the 5-speed manual transmission, the DQ200 7-speed dry dual clutch transmission for two wheel-drive versions and the DQ381 7-speed wet dual clutch transmission for all-wheel-drive versions.

Facelift 
The T-Roc facelift was unveiled in November 2021.

T-Roc R 
A high performance version of the T-Roc was launched as the T-Roc R in February 2019. It is offered with 4Motion all-wheel-drive carried over from the Golf R as standard. With a new suspension setup, it is also  lower than the standard car. It also comes with extra kit, including Akrapovič quad-exhausts and interior upgrades.

Cabriolet (AC7) 
The T-Roc Cabriolet was launched in Germany in April 2020 as VW's first convertible model in two years. Despite being based on the standard SUV model, the model does not share many body panels with the standard T-Roc, since every sheet metal behind the front wheel arches is new, and it features a longer wheelbase. It loses two rear side doors and the B-pillar in order to make the folding fabric hood possible. To deal with the loss of rigidity caused by the absent roof and B-pillar, the chassis has been strengthened with new crossbeams, and the A-pillar has been reinforced.

The roof mechanism is hidden behind the bodywork next to the rear seats, which meant the rear seat can only accommodate two passengers. Instead of a wide-opening tailgate, the boot is accessed by a smaller gap. The boot is smaller with only 284 litres available, a reduction of 161 litres over the standard version. The mechanism for the roof is shared with the discontinued Golf Cabriolet, and the soft top canvas is only available in black.

VW narrowed down the engine range of the wider T-Roc crossover line-up to just two petrol engine options for the cabriolet, 1.0-litre three-cylinder unit, developing  and a 1.5-litre four-cylinder unit producing . It is only offered in just two trim levels, which are Design and R-Line. This variant is assembled in Volkswagen plant in Osnabrück, Germany as the plant is a specialist in terms of designing and manufacturing convertible models.

It was reported that Volkswagen brand CEO Herbert Diess was dismissive and derisive of the idea of a convertible SUV, believing any vehicle in the segment will not be successful just months before announcing the T-Roc Cabriolet.

Powertrain 
In Europe, there are a variety of turbocharged petrol and diesel engines offered. For petrol engines, there are 1.0-litre TSI  turbo, 1.5-litre TSI Evo  with cylinder deactivation, the 2.0-litre TSI  petrol and the range-topping 2.0-litre TSI  for the T-Roc R. All petrol engines come with a 6-speed manual except the 2.0-litre TSI, which has a 7-speed DSG transmission, while it is available as an option with the 1.5-litre TSI Evo engine. 4Motion four-wheel drive is also standard with the 2.0-litre TSI. Diesel engines available are the 1.6 TDI  with a 6-speed manual or 2.0-litre TDI  with a 7-speed DSG transmission.

† Marketed and labeled as such in China

Sales

References

External links 

 Official website (United Kingdom)

T-Roc
Crossover sport utility vehicles
Cars introduced in 2017
2010s cars
2020s cars
Front-wheel-drive vehicles
All-wheel-drive vehicles
T-Roc
Mini sport utility vehicles
Convertibles